Robert Lee Leuschner Jr. (March 13, 1935 – July 19, 2016) was a rear admiral in the United States Navy. He was Commander of the nuclear-powered carrier  from 1983 to 1986. A native of Texas, he was born in Waco, and later moved with his family to San Diego, California, where he graduated from high school. In 1953, he was admitted to Rice Institute in Houston, where he enrolled in the chemical engineering curriculum. He also joined the Naval Reserve Officer Training Corps (NROTC), so that immediately after receiving his bachelor's degree, he was also commissioned as ensign in the U.S. Navy.

Early years
Leuschner, known as "Skip" by most of his school classmates, attended high school in San Diego, California. He was then admitted to Rice University, then named Rice Institute, where he joined the Naval Reserve Officer Training Corps (NROTC), majored in chemical engineering and graduated with a bachelor's degree in May 1957. He was immediately commissioned as ensign in the U.S. Navy, which would set his life career course.

Naval career
In September, 1957, he began flight training at Corpus Christi, Texas, becoming designated as a naval aviator in December, 1958. He was then posted to Naval Air Station Miramar, California.

Leuschner spent four years based at Miramar flying the Douglas A-1 Skyraider with the Attack Squadron 5-2.

In 1963, Leuschner entered the Naval Test Pilot School at Patuxent River, Maryland, after which he served for two years as a test pilot and project officer in the Flight Test Division. Returning to Lemoore, he trained to fly the A-7B Corsair II, after which he was redeployed to Southeast Asia, with Attack Squadron 2-1-5, aboard USS Enterprise. He returned to Lemoore, where he served as weapons officer, aircraft maintenance officer and operations officer until 1972. During this period, he was awarded the Navy Achievement Medal for establishing the Pacific Fleet Light Weapons School (LAWS) for postgraduate level air-to-ground weapons training.

Leuschner attended the Naval War College at Newport, Rhode Island in 1975, then was selected for nuclear power training, which he completed in early 1977. He was made executive officer on the Nimitz from 1978 until July 1979. After a short tour of duty onshore as a staff officer for Commander Tactical Wings, U.S. Atlantic Fleet, he was named commander of the combat stores ship  in July 1980.

Reporting to the staff of the Commander, Naval Air Force, U.S. Atlantic Fleet, in March, 1982, he directed a variety of special projects to improve the combat readiness and material condition of the United States Sixth Fleet aircraft carriers. On June 17, 1983, Leuschner became commander of the USS Enterprise.

Relief of command
The then-Capt. Robert Leuschner was replaced 27 January 1986 as skipper of the USS Enterprise after the ship struck a barely submerged rock on a seamount (Cortes Bank) 100 miles west of San Diego in November 1985, causing $17 million in damage to the hull.

Awards, honors and medals
Leuschner's individual awards include the:
 Legion of Merit, 
 Meritorious Service Medal, 
 Air Medal (28 awards). 
 Navy Commendation Medal with Gold Star and Combat " V ", 
 Navy Achievement Medal, 
 Navy Unit Commendation Medal, 
 Joint Services Commendation Medal

He also received various theater and campaign ribbons. Captain Leuschner has been selected for promotion to the rank of commodore.

See also
 Cortes Bank

Notes

References

1935 births
2016 deaths
People from Waco, Texas
Rice University alumni
United States Naval Aviators
United States Naval Test Pilot School alumni
United States Navy personnel of the Vietnam War
Recipients of the Air Medal
Recipients of the Meritorious Service Medal (United States)
Naval War College alumni
Recipients of the Legion of Merit
United States Navy admirals
Military personnel from Texas